New Hanover County Courthouse  is a historic courthouse building located in Wilmington, North Carolina and is the seat of New Hanover County. It was designed by Alfred Eichberg and James F. Post. The courthouse was erected in 1892 at corner of 3rd Street and Princess Street. An annex was built in 1925.

References 

Buildings and structures in Wilmington, North Carolina
County courthouses in North Carolina
Courthouses on the National Register of Historic Places in North Carolina
National Register of Historic Places in New Hanover County, North Carolina